Jack Dawson (4 October 1885 – 23 June 1964) was an Australian rules footballer who played with Fitzroy in the Victorian Football League (VFL).

See also
 1911 Adelaide Carnival

Notes

References
 Jack H Dawson, at New South Wales Australian Football History Society.

External links 
		

1885 births
1964 deaths
Australian rules footballers from Victoria (Australia)
Fitzroy Football Club players